A Mission to Kill is a low budget 1988 action film featuring Vietnam War sequences that was written and directed by Sean MacGregor with a story by William Smith.  The film also has been released under the titles Nightmares of Nam and The Kill Machine. MacGregor and Smith had also collaborated on Gentle Savage.

A former officer assigned to the Provincial Reconnaissance Unit returns home where he is put in, then escapes from a mental hospital.

Cast
Steve Oliver  ...  Major Steven Henry 'Hank' Miller 
Chris Casamassa  ... Young Hank Miller 
Marcy Bond  ...  Samantha  
Doug Shalin  ...  Dr. Blair  
William Smith  ...  Boris Catuli

References

External links

1988 films
Vietnam War films
1988 action films